Orbu is a settlement in Kenya's Garissa County.

References 

Populated places in Coast Province
Garissa County